Bulgaria competed at the 2018 European Athletics Championships in Berlin, Germany, from 6–12 August 2018. A delegation of 14 athletes were sent to represent the country.

The following athletes were selected to compete by the Bulgarian Athletics Federation.

Medals

Results

 Men

 Track and roadevents

Field events

Women

 Track and road events

Field events

References

Nations at the 2018 European Athletics Championships
2018
European Athletics Championships